Aadesh Chandrakant Bandekar is a Marathi actor, TV host, and a Shiv Sena secretary and leader. He is known for hosting the Marathi game show Home Minister on Zee Marathi since 2004. He is the chairman of Shree Siddhivinayak Temple Trust and has a status of Minister of State Government of Maharashtra. He holds a Degree in M.A. Political Science from University of Mumbai (2020-22).

Career

Entertainment
Bandekar hosted the musical Antakshari show Tak Dhina Dhin on DD National. Bandekar is known for hosting the game show Home Minister on Zee Marathi since 2004. In the show, Aadesh Bandekar visits various homes and plays games with the house wives where the winner wins a Paithani saree. He is popular among the women of Maharashtra as Bhauji. In 2010, while he contested the State Assembly elections, the show was hosted by actor Jitendra Joshi. Bandekar resumed the show in 2011, after losing the elections. He has also hosted many other game shows like Hapta Band, WOW, DNA, Zing Zing Zingat and Divided. He has also done compering of award shows.

Bandekar has worked in Marathi TV serials like Avaghachi Sansar and Avantika on Zee Marathi. He debuted in films opposite Mrinal Kulkarni in the film Vishwaas.

Bandekar, under his banner "Soham Productions", is also the producer of the crime-based Marathi television show Lakshya that airs on STAR Pravah.

Politics
Bandekar joined the Maharashtrian political party Shiv Sena in September 2009. He became the second member of Shiv Sena from the entertainment industry after singer and Indian Idol Season 1 winner Abhijeet Sawant had previously joined it. He contested the State Assembly elections of 2009 from the Mahim constituency. He continued his work under Shiv Sena and played a backstage role in the 2012's Brihanmumbai Municipal Corporation elections.

Aadesh Bandekar is a chairman of shree Siddhivinayak Ganpati Temple trust since July 2017 - controlled by Govt of Maharashtra status - Minister of State. Aadesh Bandekar is a president of Shiv Sena Chitrapat Sena. Aadesh Bandekar is the Brand Ambassador of Matheran hill station and Abhyuday Bank. Aadesh Bandekar is a vice chairman of the International Roll Ball Federation.

Personal life
Bandekar holds a Degree in M.A. Political Science from University of Mumbai in 2022 and has graduated from the Osmania University, Hyderabad in 1990, earning his bachelor's degree in commerce. He married Marathi and Hindi film and television actress Suchitra Bandekar in 1990. Their production house "Soham Productions" is named after their son Soham Bandekar.

Filmography

Notes
 • - In 2009 and 2011, Jitendra Joshi and Nilesh Sable hosted the show respectively.

References

External links 

Living people
Male actors from Mumbai
Male actors in Marathi cinema
Indian male film actors
Indian television presenters
Shiv Sena politicians
Marathi politicians
Maharashtra politicians
Indian male television actors
1966 births
Male actors in Marathi television